Sarstedt is a town in the district of Hildesheim, Lower Saxony, Germany. It has approximately 18,500 inhabitants. Sarstedt is situated 20 km south of Hanover and 10 km north of Hildesheim. Sarstedt station is on the Hanoverian Southern Railway and is served by the Hanover S-Bahn.

The GEO 600 gravitational wave detector is located nearby.

The former independent municipality Giften has been a part of Sarstedt since 1 March 1974.

Mayor
The mayor of Sarstedt is Heike Brennecke (SPD). She was elected in September 2014, and re-elected in 2021. The predecessor was Karl-Heinz Wondratschek (SPD).

Famous people from Sarstedt 
 Jean-Henri Pape (1789-1875), German-French piano maker
 Walter Mahlendorf (born 1935), athlete, Olympic champion Olympic Summer Games 1960 4 × 100 m relay 
Rudolf Schenker, (born 1948), rhythm guitarist, main songwriter and founding member of hardrock band Scorpions
 Harald Grosskopf (born 1949), musician, 1965 to 1966 drummer of the Sarstedter Beatband 'The Stuntmen' '
Marianne Bachmeier (1950-1996), vigilante who shot the supposed murderer of her daughter Anna Bachmeier in a court room in Lübeck in 1981 
Michael Schenker, (born 1955), brother of Rudolf Schenker, virtuoso guitarist from UFO, Scorpions and Michael Schenker Group

References

External links 

 Sarstedt official website

Towns in Lower Saxony
Hildesheim (district)